Stanislaus Andrew Blejwas (5 October 1941 – 23 September 2001) was an American historian specializing in modern Polish history. He was of Polish descent and born in Brooklyn, New York to Stanisław and Catherine (Komorowski) Blejwas. He received a B.A., summa cum laude, in 1963 from Providence College, and the M.A. (1966) and Ph.D. (1973) from Columbia University.

Blejwas spent most of his career researching and teaching at Central Connecticut State University. At CCSU he held the Endowed Chair in Polish and Polish American Studies that was later named after him.

In 1996 Blejwas received the Order of Merit of the Republic of Poland.

References

External links
Obituary, Published in The Hartford Courant from Sept. 25 to Sept. 26, 2001

1941 births
2001 deaths
20th-century American historians
American male non-fiction writers
Historians of Poland
Providence College alumni
Columbia University alumni
American people of Polish descent
Central Connecticut State University faculty
Recipients of the Order of Merit of the Republic of Poland
20th-century American male writers